Inspired Education Group is a co-educational, non-denominational, international provider of private schools. It was founded in 2013 by Lebanese-British businessman Nadim Nsouli and is headquartered in London. 

It provides education for children aged 1 year up to 18 years, and to date has around 50,000 students globally.

History 

Inspired Education Group was founded in 2013 by Nadim M. Nsouli, a businessman and co-founder of Lyla Nsouli Foundation for Children’s Brain Cancer, when his group acquired Reddam House in South Africa. Since 2013, Reddam House has acquired and constructed nine schools in South Africa, along with the Inspired’s “flagship school,” Reddam House Berkshire, near Wokingham, England. In 2015 the school grounds in Winnersh were taken over from Bearwood College.

Nsouli, the founder, CEO and Chairman, has worked as a lawyer and as an investment banker, and he has led the group since its founding. Inspired's President is Graeme Crawford, a South African educator and founder of Reddam House. Nicholas Wergan is the Group Education Director; and joined Inspired in 2019.

The group's strategy has been described as "buy and build", involving the purchase of existing schools, as well as the building of new schools. It has offices in London, Milan, Auckland, Bogotá, Johannesburg, and Dubai.

Schools in other European countries that form part of the Inspired group include St. George's International School, Switzerland, St. John's International School, Belgium, St. Louis School, Italy, and Sotogrande International School, Spain. In the Middle East, the group has acquired British School of Bahrain. Inspired's Latin American schools include Blue Valley School, Costa Rica, Colegio San Mateo, Colombia, and Cambridge College Lima, Peru. By 2017, Inspired operated more than 30 schools, and as of 2018 educated over 35,000 students in 46 schools.

Inspired acquired part of New Zealand's biggest private-education provider ACG Education’s schools division in 2018 from Pacific Equity Partners for approximately 500 million.

In 2020, Inspired was described as "the world's largest premium education provider," with 64 schools spread across five continents. In addition to several investments from firms such as Oakley Capital and TA Associates, Inspired has partnered on educational programs with Berklee College of Music.

It acquired private tutoring company, Ostaz in 2021.

In May 2021, Inspired acquired Wey Education PLC, a leader in online education through its two brands, InterHigh and Academy21.

Inspired owned online schools, InterHigh and King's College Online merged in November 2021, relaunching under the new name King's InterHigh.

In May 2022, Stonepeak, a US private equity company, invested €1bn in exchange for a minority stake in Inspired.

On May 20th, La Miranda The Global Quality School, in Barcelona, Spain joined Inspired.

References

External links 

 Official website

Education companies of the United Kingdom
Education management organizations
Education companies of South Africa